Jonathan "Jim" Parker was an English professional footballer from Barrow-in-Furness, Lancashire who played as a central defender.

References

Footballers from Barrow-in-Furness
English footballers
Association football defenders
Burnley F.C. players
Bradford (Park Avenue) A.F.C. players
Barrow A.F.C. players
English Football League players
Year of death missing
Year of birth missing
Footballers from Cumbria
20th-century English people